Marquise "Hollywood"  Brown (born June 4, 1997) is an American football wide receiver for the Arizona Cardinals of the National Football League (NFL). He played college football at College of the Canyons and Oklahoma and was drafted by the Baltimore Ravens in the first round of the 2019 NFL Draft.

Early years
Brown was born on June 4, 1997 in Hollywood, Florida. He played Pop Warner football in the same Florida league with Ravens quarterback Lamar Jackson, though the two were on different teams. Brown attended South Broward High School in Hollywood, where he also ran track. As an 11th grader Brown ran the 100 meters in a time of 11.53 seconds at the Florida High Schools Athletic Association's 4A District 13 regional championship track meet. He transferred to Chaminade-Madonna College Preparatory School where in addition to playing football he also ran track, improving his 100-meter time to 10.90 seconds and posting a personal-best time of 21.94 seconds in the 200 meters at the Florida High Schools Athletic Association's 2A District 15 regional championship track meet.

College career
After not receiving any scholarships from Division 1 schools, Brown signed with the College of the Canyons for the 2016 season.  Because California Junior colleges do not offer sports scholarships, Brown worked at Six Flags Magic Mountain to make ends meet.  After a year at College of the Canyons, Brown received several Division 1 scholarship offers, committing to Oklahoma.  During his first year at Oklahoma, Brown played all thirteen games, starting eight, and had a team high 1,095 receiving yards, becoming the 8th all time receiver in single season yards. He also posted 265 yards against Oklahoma State, an Oklahoma record for receiving yards in a single game.  On January 2, 2019, Brown announced that he would forgo his final year of eligibility to declare for the 2019 NFL Draft.

College statistics

Professional career

Baltimore Ravens
Brown was selected 25th overall by the Baltimore Ravens in the first round of the 2019 NFL Draft. He was the first wide receiver selected. He signed his rookie contract on June 7, 2019.

2019
Brown made his regular season debut against the Miami Dolphins in Week 1, recording four receptions, 147 receiving yards and two touchdowns. Despite playing only 14 snaps, Brown became the first player in NFL history to score two touchdowns of 40 yards or more in his first game. Brown caught eight passes for 86 yards in a Week 2 win against the Cardinals. Brown missed Weeks 6 and 7 due to injury. In Week 12 against the Los Angeles Rams, Brown caught five passes for 42 yards and two touchdowns in a 45–6 win. In Week 15, Brown caught his seventh touchdown in a 42–21 win over the New York Jets, which tied the Ravens franchise record for most receiving touchdowns by a rookie. Brown finished 2019 as the Ravens' second leading receiver behind tight end Mark Andrews. In his playoff debut, Brown led both teams with seven catches for 126 receiving yards in a 12–28 Divisional Round loss to the Tennessee Titans.

2020
Brown recorded five receptions for 101 receiving yards in the 38–6 victory over the Cleveland Browns in Week 1. In Week 8 against the Pittsburgh Steelers, Brown recorded one catch for a three yard touchdown during the 24–28 loss. After the game, Brown posted a later deleted tweet saying "What's the point of having souljas when you never use them (Never!!)" due to his lack of involvement in the Ravens' offense. In Week 12 against the Pittsburgh Steelers, Brown recorded 4 catches for 85 yards, including a 70 yard touchdown reception from Trace McSorley, during the 14–19 loss. In Week 14 against the Cleveland Browns, he had three drops, but also had a game-saving 44-yard touchdown reception on 4th and 5 with 1:51 left in the game. He finished the game with two catches for 50 yards as the Ravens won 47–42. He was placed on the reserve/COVID-19 list by the team on December 16, 2020, and activated three days later. Brown finished the regular season with 769 yards and eight touchdowns.

In the AFC Wild Card playoffs against the Tennessee Titans, Brown had seven receptions for 109 yards as the Ravens won 20–13.

2021
In 2021, Brown changed his jersey number from #15 to #5 following a change of the NFL's jersey number rules. In Week 2 against the Kansas City Chiefs, Brown had six receptions for 113 yards and a touchdown. It was his third 100-yard regular season game of his career and his first since Week 1 of the 2020 season. The Ravens would rally to win the game 36–35. In Week 5 against the Indianapolis Colts, Brown caught a career-high nine receptions for 125 yards and two touchdowns, including the game-winner, as the Ravens again rallied to win in overtime 31–25.

Arizona Cardinals

2022
On April 28, 2022, on Day 1 of the 2022 NFL Draft, Brown and the Ravens' third-round pick were traded to the Arizona Cardinals for the 23rd pick in the first round. The trade also reunited Brown with his college quarterback Kyler Murray. The Cardinals picked up the fifth-year option on Brown's contract on April 28, 2022.

In Week 3, Brown caught 14 of 17 targets for 140 yards against the Rams. 

In Week 6, Brown suffered a fractured foot and was placed on injured reserve on October 20, 2022.

Brown caught 43 receptions for 485 yards and accounted for 3 receiving touchdowns in the first six games of the season. He led the team in all three categories during that time.

On November 16, 2022 the Cardinals announced that Brown was designated to return from injured reserve. He participated in the teams practices leading up to Week 11 but was not activated. He was then activated on November 26 for the team's Week 12 matchup.
In his return to action, he had 6 receptions for 46 yards in a loss to the Chargers.

Marquise finished the season as the second best receiver on the Cardinals, catching 68 passes for 709 yards. Only behind his teammate Deandre Hopkins.

NFL career statistics

Regular season

Postseason

Personal life
Marquise Brown is the cousin of Antonio Brown. Brown received his nickname "Hollywood" from sportscaster Gus Johnson while at Oklahoma.
His father is Edwin Brown. His mother is Shannon James (maiden name Warner).

On August 3, 2022, at 7:05 AM, Brown was arrested and charged with criminal speeding (going 126 mph) in north Phoenix and was booked into the Maricopa County Jail.

References

External links

 Sports-Reference (college)
Baltimore Ravens bio
College of the Canyons Cougars bio
Oklahoma Sooners bio

1997 births
Living people
Brown, Marquise
Sportspeople from Hollywood, Florida
Chaminade-Madonna College Preparatory School alumni
Players of American football from Florida
American football wide receivers
College of the Canyons Cougars football players
Oklahoma Sooners football players
All-American college football players
Baltimore Ravens players
Arizona Cardinals players